Novi Golubovec is a village and municipality in Krapina-Zagorje County in northern Croatia. According to the 2011 census, there are 996 inhabitants in the area, in the following settlements:
 Gora Veternička, population 238
 Novi Golubovec, population 217
 Očura, population 77
 Velika Veternička, population 295
 Veternica, population 169

An absolute majority of the population are Croats.

References

Populated places in Krapina-Zagorje County
Municipalities of Croatia